Casino Royale is a 1967 spy parody film originally distributed by Columbia Pictures featuring an ensemble cast. It is loosely based on the 1953 novel of the same name by Ian Fleming, the first novel to feature the character James Bond. The film stars David Niven as the "original" Bond, Sir James Bond 007. Forced out of retirement to investigate the deaths and disappearances of international spies, he soon battles the mysterious Dr. Noah and SMERSH. The film's tagline: "Casino Royale is too much... for one James Bond!" refers to Bond's ruse to mislead SMERSH in which six other agents are pretending to be "James Bond", namely, baccarat master Evelyn Tremble (Peter Sellers); millionaire spy Vesper Lynd (Ursula Andress); Bond's secretary Miss Moneypenny (Barbara Bouchet); Bond's daughter with Mata Hari, Mata Bond (Joanna Pettet); and British agents Coop (Terence Cooper) and The Detainer (Daliah Lavi).

Charles K. Feldman, the producer, had acquired the film rights in 1960 and had attempted to get Casino Royale made as an Eon Productions Bond film; however, Feldman and the producers of the Eon series, Albert R. Broccoli and Harry Saltzman, failed to come to terms. Believing that he could not compete with the Eon series, Feldman resolved to produce the film as a satire. The budget escalated as various directors and writers became involved in the production, and actors expressed dissatisfaction with the project.

Casino Royale was released on 13 April 1967, two months prior to Eon's fifth Bond movie, You Only Live Twice. The film was a financial success, grossing over $41.7 million worldwide, and  Burt Bacharach's musical score was praised, earning him an Academy Award nomination for the song "The Look of Love". Critical reaction to Casino Royale, however, was generally negative, with many reviewers regarding it as a baffling, disorganised affair. Since 1999, the film's rights have been held by Metro-Goldwyn-Mayer Pictures, distributors of the Bond films by Eon Productions.

Plot
Sir James Bond 007, a legendary British spy who retired 20 years ago, is visited by, M, the head of British MI6, CIA representative Ransome, KGB representative Smernov, and Deuxième Bureau representative Le Grand. All implore Bond to come out of retirement to deal with SMERSH, who have been eliminating agents. Bond spurns their pleas. He stands firm, and his mansion is destroyed by a mortar at the orders of M, who dies in the explosion.

Bond returns M's remains (a toupee) to his grieving widow, Lady Fiona McTarry, at M's Scottish estate. However, the real Lady Fiona has been replaced by SMERSH's Agent Mimi. The  household has been replaced with beautiful women. SMERSH aims to destroy Bond's “celibate image".The bevy of beauties fail to seduce Bond, and Mimi/Lady Fiona is so impressed that she helps Bond foil the plot against him and joins a convent. 

On his way back to London, Bond survives another attempt on his life.

Bond is named head of MI6. He learns that many British agents around the world have been eliminated by enemy spies because of their inability to resist sex. Bond also learns that the "sex maniac" who was given the name of "James Bond" when he retired has gone to work in television. Bond orders that all remaining MI6 agents will be named "James Bond 007", to confuse SMERSH. He creates a rigorous programme to train male agents to ignore women's charms. Moneypenny recruits Coop, a karate expert. He also meets an exotic agent known as the Detainer.

Bond hires Vesper Lynd, a retired agent turned millionaire, to recruit baccarat expert Evelyn Tremble, whom he intends to use to beat SMERSH agent Le Chiffre. Le Chiffre has embezzled SMERSH's money, and is desperate to cover up his theft before he is executed.

Following a clue from agent Mimi, Bond persuades his estranged daughter, Mata Bond, to travel to West Berlin and infiltrate International Mothers' Help, an au pair service that is actually  a SMERSH training center. Mata uncovers a plan to sell compromising photographs of military leaders from the US, USSR, China and Great Britain at an "art auction", another money-raising  scheme from Le Chiffre. Mata destroys the photos leaving baccarat Le Chiffre's only remaining option.

Tremble arrives at the Casino Royale accompanied by Lynd, who foils an attempt by seductive SMERSH agent Miss Goodthighs to disable him. Later that night, Tremble observes Le Chiffre  at the casino and realises that he is using infrared sunglasses to cheat. Lynd steals the sunglasses, allowing Evelyn to eventually beat Le Chiffre in a game of baccarat. Lynd is apparently abducted outside the casino, and Tremble is also kidnapped while pursuing her. Le Chiffre, desperate for the winning cheque, tortures Tremble using hallucinogens. Lynd rescues Tremble, only to subsequently kill him. 

Meanwhile, SMERSH agents raid Le Chiffre's base and kill him.

In London, Mata is kidnapped by SMERSH in a giant flying saucer, and Sir James and Moneypenny travel to Casino Royale to rescue her. They discover that the casino is located atop a giant underground headquarters run by the evil Dr. Noah,  Sir James's nephew Jimmy Bond, a former MI6 agent who defected to SMERSH to spite his famous uncle. Jimmy reveals that he plans to use biological warfare to make all women beautiful and kill all men over 4-foot-6-inch (1.37 m) tall, leaving him the "big man" who gets all the girls. Jimmy has already captured The Detainer, and he tries to persuade her to be his partner. She agrees, but only to dupe him into swallowing one of his atomic time pills, turning him into a walking atomic bomb.

Sir James, Moneypenny, Mata and Coop manage to escape from their cell and fight their way back to the casino director's office where Sir James establishes that Lynd is a double agent. The casino is overrun by secret agents and a battle ensues. American and French support arrive, adding to the chaos. Meanwhile, Jimmy counts down a series of hiccups, each bringing him closer to doom. The atomic pill explodes, destroying Casino Royale and everyone inside. Sir James and his agents appear in Heaven, and Jimmy Bond descends to Hell.

Cast
 Peter Sellers as Evelyn Tremble / James Bond: A baccarat master recruited by Vesper Lynd to challenge Le Chiffre at Casino Royale.
 Ursula Andress as Vesper Lynd / James Bond: A retired British secret agent forced back into service in exchange for writing off her tax arrears.
 David Niven as Sir James Bond: A legendary British secret agent forced out of retirement to fight SMERSH.
 Orson Welles as Le Chiffre: SMERSH's financial agent, desperate to win at baccarat to repay the money he has embezzled from the organisation.
 Joanna Pettet as Mata Bond / James Bond: Bond's daughter, born of his love affair with Mata Hari.
 Daliah Lavi as The Detainer / James Bond: A British secret agent who successfully poisons Dr. Noah with his own atomic pill.
 Woody Allen as Jimmy Bond / Dr. Noah: Bond's nephew and head of SMERSH under his Dr. Noah alias. Because he is rendered mute in the presence of his uncle, he uses a prerecorded voice (that of Valentine Dyall) in some scenes.
 Deborah Kerr as Agent Mimi / Lady Fiona McTarry: A SMERSH agent who masquerades as the widow of M but cannot help falling in love with Bond.
 William Holden as Ransome: A CIA executive who accompanies the cross-spy-agency team to persuade Bond out of retirement, then reappears in the final climactic fight scene.
 Charles Boyer as Legrand: A Deuxième Bureau executive who accompanies the cross-spy-agency team to see Bond.
 John Huston as M / McTarry: Head of MI6 who dies from an explosion caused by his own bombardment of Bond's estate when the cross-spy-agency team visits.
 Kurt Kasznar as Smernov: A KGB executive who accompanies the cross-spy-agency team to see Bond.
 Barbara Bouchet as Miss Moneypenny / James Bond 007: The beautiful daughter of Bond's original Moneypenny, who works for the service in the same position her mother had years before.
 Terence Cooper as Coop / James Bond: A British secret agent specifically chosen, and trained for this mission to resist the charms of women.
 George Raft as himself, flicking a coin as he did in Scarface.
 Jean-Paul Belmondo as French Legionnaire

Major stars, such as Raft and Belmondo, were given top billing in marketing and screen trailers despite only appearing for a few minutes in the final scene.

Supporting cast:
 Jacqueline Bisset (credited as Jacky Bisset) as Miss Goodthighs: A SMERSH agent who attempts to kill Evelyn at Casino Royale. She also appeared as an extra who stands behind Le Chiffre at the casino.
 Bernard Cribbins as Carlton Towers: A British Foreign Office official who drives Mata Bond all the way from London to Berlin in his taxi.
 Ronnie Corbett as Polo: A SMERSH agent at the International Mothers' Help, in love with Mata Hari and expresses the same feelings for Mata Bond.
 Anna Quayle as Frau Hoffner: Mata Hari's teacher, portrayed as a parody of Cesare in the German Expressionist film The Cabinet of Dr. Caligari (her school is modelled on that film's expressionist decor).
 Geoffrey Bayldon as Q
 John Wells as Fordyce: Q's assistant.
 Gabriella Licudi, Angela Scoular, Tracey Crisp, Elaine Taylor and Alexandra Bastedo as Eliza, Buttercup, Heather, Peg and Meg: A quintet of SMERSH agents undercover as M/Lord McTarry's daughters.
 Derek Nimmo as Hadley: A British secret serviceman who briefs Mata Bond on her mission to Berlin.
 Colin Gordon as Casino director
 John Bluthal as MI5 Man/Casino doorman
 Graham Stark as Cashier
 Duncan Macrae as Inspector Mathis: He shows Evelyn Tremble his "credentials" in the pre-title sequence.
 Richard Wattis as British Army officer
 Vladek Sheybal as Le Chiffre's representative
 Tracy Reed as Fang Leader
 Chic Murray as Chic
 Jonathan Routh as John
 Percy Herbert as First piper
 Jeanne Roland as Captain of the Guards
 Burt Kwouk as Chinese general (uncredited)
 Caroline Munro as a guard (uncredited)

Casino Royale also boasts the greatest number of actors in a Bond film either to have appeared or to go on to appear in the rest of the Eon series – besides Andress in Dr. No, Sheybal appeared as Kronsteen in From Russia with Love, Kwouk featured as Mr. Ling in Goldfinger and an unnamed SPECTRE operative in You Only Live Twice, Roland plays a masseuse in You Only Live Twice, and Scoular appeared as Ruby Bartlett in On Her Majesty's Secret Service. Jack Gwillim, who has a minor role as a British Army officer, played a Royal Navy officer in Thunderball. Caroline Munro, seen very briefly as one of Dr Noah's gun-toting guards, went on to play Naomi in The Spy Who Loved Me, and also appeared with other models on the cover of the 1969 Pan Books edition of On Her Majesty's Secret Service. Milton Reid, who appears in a bit part as the temple guard, opening the door to Mata Bond's hall, played one of Dr. No's guards and Stromberg's underling, Sandor, in The Spy Who Loved Me. John Hollis, who plays the temple priest in Mata Bond's hall, went on to play the implied Ernst Stavro Blofeld character in the pre-credits sequence of For Your Eyes Only. John Wells, Q's assistant, appeared in For Your Eyes Only as Denis Thatcher. Hal Galili, who appears briefly as a US Army officer at the auction, had earlier played gangster Jack Strap in Goldfinger.

Uncredited cast
Well-established stars such as Peter O'Toole, and sporting legends like Stirling Moss took uncredited parts solely to work with the other cast members. O'Toole supposedly took payment in a case of champagne.

Stunt director Richard Talmadge employed Geraldine Chaplin to appear in a brief Keystone Cops insert. The film proved to be young Anjelica Huston's first experience in the film industry as she was called upon by her father, John Huston, to cover the screenshots of Kerr's hands. It features the first theatrical appearance of David Prowse as Frankenstein's monster. John Le Mesurier features in early scenes as M's driver.

Production

Development
In November 1952, several months before the publication of his first James Bond novel Casino Royale, Ian Fleming purchased the small theatrical agency Glidrose Productions Limited to make a screen adaptation of the novel. After the publication, Curtis Brown, Associated British Pictures and the Music Corporation of America all expressed interest in purchasing the film rights. Curtis Brown later licensed the rights to produce a one-hour Americanized television adaptation for Climax! on CBS. In March 1955, Fleming sold the film rights of his novel Casino Royale to the producer Gregory Ratoff for $6,000 ($ in  dollars). after Ratoff had bought a $600 six-month option from Fleming the previous year. Ratoff commissioned Lorenzo Semple Jr., to write a script but both men thought Bond was unbelievable and stupid. According to Semple, Ratoff considered the project needed Bond to be female and wished to cast Susan Hayward as 'Jane' Bond. In January 1956, The New York Times reported Ratoff had set up a production company with Michael Garrison to produce a film adaptation, but their pitch was rejected by 20th Century Fox and they were unable to find financial backers before his death in December 1960. Talent agent Charles K. Feldman had represented Ratoff and bought the film rights from his widow. Albert R. Broccoli, who had held an interest in adapting James Bond for some years, offered to purchase the Casino Royale rights from Feldman, but he declined. Feldman and his friend, the director Howard Hawks, had an interest in adapting Casino Royale and considered Leigh Brackett as a writer and Cary Grant as James Bond. They eventually decided not to proceed after they saw Dr. No (1962), the first Bond adaptation made by Broccoli and his partner Harry Saltzman through their company Eon Productions.

By 1964, with Feldman having invested nearly $550,000 of his own money into pre-production of Casino Royale, he decided to try a deal with Eon Productions and United Artists. The attempt at a co-production eventually fell through as Feldman frequently argued with Broccoli and Saltzman, especially regarding the profit divisions and when the Casino Royale adaptation would start production. Feldman eventually decided to offer his project to Columbia Pictures through a script written by Ben Hecht, and the studio accepted. Given Eon's series led to spy films being in vogue at the time, Feldman opted to make his film a spoof of the Bond series instead of a straightforward adaptation. Hecht's contribution to the project, if not the final result, was in fact substantial and he wrote several complete drafts. In May 1966, Time magazine reported that Hecht had "three bashes" at completing a script, while his papers contained material from four surviving screenplays by Hecht. His treatments were almost entirely "straight" adaptations, far closer to the original source novel than the spoof which the final production became. A draft from 1957 discovered in Hecht's papers — but which does not identify the screenwriter — is a direct adaptation of the novel, albeit with the Bond character absent, instead being replaced by a poker-playing American gangster.

Later drafts see vice made central to the plot, with the Le Chiffre character becoming head of a network of brothels (as he is in the novel) whose patrons are then blackmailed by Le Chiffre to fund Spectre (an invention of the screenwriter). The racy plot elements opened up by this change of background include a chase scene through Hamburg's red light district that results in Bond escaping disguised as a female mud wrestler. New characters appear such as Lili Wing, a brothel madam and former lover of Bond whose ultimate fate is to be crushed in the back of a garbage truck, and Gita, wife of Le Chiffre. The beautiful Gita, whose face and throat are hideously disfigured as a result of Bond using her as a shield during a gunfight in the same sequence which sees Wing meet her fate, goes on to become the prime protagonist in the torture scene that features in the book, a role originally Le Chiffre's. Virtually nothing from Hecht's scripts was ever filmed, although a draft dated to February 1964 has a line of dialogue containing the idea of MI6 having given multiple agents the name of James Bond after Bond has died to confuse the other side. Hecht died from a heart attack in April 1964, two days after finishing his script and before he was able to present it to Feldman. Joseph Heller (and his friend George Mandel) worked on the project for a few weeks in early 1965 submitting  more than 100 pages after Feldman offered Heller $150,000. Heller later wrote about this episode in How I found James Bond, lost my self-respect and almost made $150,000 in my spare time.

The script was then completely re-written by Billy Wilder, and by the time the film reached production, only the idea that the name James Bond should be given to a number of other agents remained. This key plot device in the finished film, in the case of Hecht's version, occurs after the demise of the original James Bond (an event which happened prior to the beginning of his story) which, as Hecht's M puts it, "not only perpetuates his memory, but confuses the opposition." In addition to the credited writers, Woody Allen, Peter Sellers, Val Guest, Ben Hecht, Joseph Heller, Terry Southern and Wilder are all believed to have contributed to the screenplay to varying degrees. Feldman called it "a four ring circus". Sellers had hired Southern to write his dialogue (and not the rest of the script) to "outshine" Orson Welles and Allen.

Casting

Feldman approached Sean Connery to play Bond, but rejected Connery's offer to do the film for $1 million. Feldman originally intended to cast Terence Cooper as Bond and had him under personal contract for two years prior to production. Feldman had worked with Sellers on What's New Pussycat? and offered the actor a part as Bond. Sellers originally turned him down saying he felt the image of Bond was "too fixed". Feldman persuaded Sellers to change his mind by asking the actor to instead play a "little man" who plays Bond. Jean-Paul Belmondo and George Raft received major billing, even though both only appear briefly. Both appear during the climactic brawl at the end, Raft flipping his trademark coin and promptly shooting himself dead with a backward-firing pistol, while Belmondo appears wearing a fake moustache as the French Foreign Legion officer who requires an English phrase book to translate "merde!" into "ooch!" during his fistfight. Raft's coin flip, which originally appeared in Scarface (1932), had been spoofed by Raft a few years earlier in Some Like It Hot (1959).

At the Intercon science fiction convention held in Slough in 1978, David Prowse commented on his part, apparently his big-screen debut. He claimed that he was originally asked to play "Super Pooh", a giant Winnie-the-Pooh in a superhero costume who attacks Tremble during the Torture of The Mind sequence. This idea, as with many others in the film's script, was rapidly dropped, and Prowse was re-cast as a Frankenstein-type monster for the closing scenes. The final sequence was principally directed by former actor/stuntman Richard Talmadge.

Filming
Filming started 11 January 1966. The principal filming was carried out at Pinewood Studios, Shepperton Studios and Twickenham Studios in London. Extensive sequences also featured London, notably Trafalgar Square and the exterior of 10 Downing Street. Mereworth Castle in Kent was used as the home of Sir James Bond, which is blown up early in the film. Much of filming for M's Scottish castle was done on location in County Meath, Ireland, with Killeen Castle as the focus. However, the car chase sequences where Bond leaves the castle were shot in the Perthshire village of Killin with further sequences in Berkshire (specifically Old Windsor and Bracknell). Filming had wrapped by October 1966 at which stage Feldman said the budget was between $8.5–9.5 million, of which the cast cost $3 million. Sellers was to receive a percentage of the gross after the takings reached $17.5 million.

Five different directors helmed different segments and stunt coordinator Richard Talmadge co-directed the final sequence. Feldman said that Huston contributed 38 minutes in the final cut, Hughes 25 minutes, McGrath 20 minutes, Parrish 20 minutes, and Guest 26 minutes. Huston's sequence involved Sir James Bond meeting the representatives of agencies. It was shot in Ireland and Kent in April 1966. Huston worked on his section of the script with Wolf Mankowitz. Huston had written most of Beat the Devil on location but says "that was discipline compared to this. It was day to day then it's moment to moment here." Huston wanted Robert Morley as M but when he was unavailable, the director decided to play the role himself. Huston says the film "was broached to me as a lark, which it was." McGrath shot for six weeks. Bob Parrish filmed the segment with Andress and Sellers at Shepperton. Hughes was not known for comedies generally but had just directed Drop Dead Darling. Guest wrote and directed the last section and was given the responsibility of splicing the various "chapters" together. Feldman says Parrish was to provide "suspense" while McGrath did "Sellers like comedy". He was offered the unique title of coordinating director but declined, claiming the chaotic plot would not reflect well on him if he were so credited. His extra credit was labelled 'additional sequences' instead. Guest, Hughes, Huston, McGrath, Parrish, and Talmadge received the directorial credits for Casino Royale.

Part of the behind-the-scenes drama of production concerned the filming of the segments involving Sellers. Screenwriter Wolf Mankowitz declared that Sellers felt intimidated by Welles to the extent that, except for a couple of shots, neither was in the studio simultaneously. Other versions of the legend depict the drama stemming from Sellers being slighted, in favour of Welles, by Princess Margaret (whom Sellers knew) during her visit to the set. Welles also insisted on performing magic tricks as Le Chiffre, and the director obliged. Director Guest wrote that Welles did not think much of Sellers, and had refused to work with "that amateur". Director McGrath, a personal friend of Sellers, was punched by the actor when he complained about Sellers' on-set behaviour.

Some Sellers biographies suggest that he took the role of Bond to heart, and was annoyed at the decision to make Casino Royale a comedy, as he wanted to play Bond straight. This is illustrated in somewhat fictionalised form in the film The Life and Death of Peter Sellers, based on the biography by Roger Lewis, who has claimed that Sellers kept re-writing and improvising scenes to make them play seriously. This story is in agreement with the observation that the only parts of the film close to the book are the ones featuring Sellers and Welles. In the end, Sellers's involvement with the film was cut abruptly short. Additionally, Sellers went absent for days or weeks at a time, refused to appear in his scenes with Welles and exited before all of his scenes had been shot. As a result, Sellers was unavailable for the filming of an ending and other interlinking scenes, leaving the filmmakers to devise a way to make the existing footage work without him. The framing device of a beginning and ending with Niven was created to salvage the material. Guest, who had been given the task of creating a narrative thread which would link all segments of the film, chose to use the original Bond and Vesper Lynd as linking characters.

Signs of missing footage from the Sellers segments are evident at various points. Tremble is not captured on camera; an outtake of Sellers entering a racing car was substituted. In this outtake, he calls for the car, à la The Pink Panther, to chase down Vesper and her kidnappers; the next thing that is shown is Tremble being tortured. Outtakes of Sellers were also used for Tremble's dream sequence (pretending to play the piano on Andress' torso), in the finale – blowing out the candles while in highland dress – and at the end of the film when all the various "James Bond doubles" are together. In the kidnap sequence, Tremble's death is also very abruptly inserted; it consists of pre-existing footage of Tremble being rescued by Vesper, followed by a later-filmed shot of her abruptly deciding to shoot him, followed by a freeze-frame over some of the previous footage of her surrounded by bodies (noticeably a zoom-in on the previous shot). As well as this, an entire sequence involving Tremble going to the front for the underground James Bond training school (which turns out to be under Harrods, of which the training area was the lowest level) was never shot, thus creating an abrupt cut from Vesper announcing that Tremble will be James Bond to Tremble exiting the lift into the training school. Many sequences were dropped, so that several actors never appeared in the final cut, including Ian Hendry (as 006, the agent whose body is briefly seen being disposed of by Vesper), Mona Washbourne and Arthur Mullard.

Music

For the musical score, Feldman decided to bring in Burt Bacharach, who had done the score for his previous production, What's New Pussycat?. Bacharach worked over two years writing for Casino Royale, in the meantime composing the After the Fox score and being forced to decline participation in Luv. Lyricist Hal David contributed with various songs, many of which appeared in just instrumental versions. Herb Alpert & the Tijuana Brass performed some of the songs with Mike Redway singing the title song as the end credits roll. The title theme was Alpert's second number one on the Easy Listening chart where it spent two weeks at the top in June 1967 and peaked at number 27 on the Billboard Hot 100. Alpert would later contribute a trumpet solo to the title song of the 1983 James Bond film Never Say Never Again, which was performed by Alpert's wife, Lani Hall.

The film features the song "The Look of Love" performed by Dusty Springfield. It is played in the scene of Vesper recruiting Evelyn, seen through a man-size aquarium in a seductive walk. It was nominated for the Academy Award for Best Original Song. The song was revisited in the first Austin Powers film, which, to a degree, was inspired by Casino Royale. For European release, Mireille Mathieu sang versions of "The Look of Love" in both French ("Les Yeux D'Amour"), and German ("Ein Blick von Dir").

Bacharach would later rework two tracks of the score into songs: "Home James, Don't Spare the Horses" was re-arranged as "Bond Street", appearing on Bacharach's album Reach Out (1967), and "Flying Saucer – First Stop Berlin", was reworked with vocals as "Let the Love Come Through" by orchestra leader and arranger Roland Shaw. A clarinet melody would later be featured in a Cracker Jack peanut popcorn commercial. As an in-joke, a brief snippet of John Barry's song "Born Free" is used in the film. At the time, Barry was the main composer for the Eon Bond series, and said song had won an Academy Award over Bacharach's own "Alfie".

The cover art was done by Robert McGinnis, based on the film poster. The original LP was later issued by Varèse Sarabande in the same track order as shown below. It has been re-released under licence by Kritzerland Records and again by Quartet Records, the latter to mark the film's 50th anniversary. This latest issue has included almost all of Bacharach's underscore, representing 35 tracks in total.

Soundtrack listing

The album became famous among audio purists for the excellence of its recording.  It then became a standard "audiophile test" record for decades to come, especially the vocal performance by Dusty Springfield on "The Look of Love."

The soundtrack has since been released by other companies in different configurations (including complete score releases). The highly regarded master tapes were damaged, however, during a 1990s remastering so none of the subsequent re-releases is considered to be as fine as the original LP release.

Release
Columbia at first announced the film was due to be released in time for Christmas 1966, however problems during production postponed the film's release until April 1967. Casino Royale had its world premiere in London's Odeon Leicester Square on 13 April 1967, breaking many opening records in the theatre's history. Its American premiere was held in New York on 28 April, at the Capitol and Cinema I theatres. It opened two months prior to the fifth Bond film by Eon Productions, You Only Live Twice.

Box office
Despite the lukewarm nature of the contemporary reviews, the pull of the James Bond name was sufficient to make it the 13th highest-grossing film in North America in 1967 with a gross of $22.7 million ($ million in  dollars) and a worldwide total of $41.7 million ($ million in  dollars). Welles attributed the success to a marketing strategy that featured a naked tattooed woman on the film's posters and print ads. The campaign also included a series of commercials featuring British model Twiggy.  In its opening weekend in the United States and Canada, it set a record 3-day gross for Columbia of $2,148,711. As late as 2011, the film was still making money for the estate of Peter Sellers, who negotiated an extraordinary 3% of the gross profits (an estimated £120 million), with the proceeds currently going to Cassie Unger, daughter and sole heir of Sellers' beneficiary, fourth wife Lynne Frederick. When domestic box office receipts are adjusted for inflation, Casino Royale is 20th-largest grossing of the entire Bond franchise.

Critical reception
No advance press screenings were held, leading reviews to only appear after the premiere. Roger Ebert, in his review for the Chicago Sun-Times, wrote "[t]his is possibly the most indulgent film ever made". Time magazine described Casino Royale as "an incoherent and vulgar vaudeville". Variety declared the film to be "a conglomeration of frenzied situations, 'in' gags and special effects, lacking discipline and cohesion. Some of the situations are very funny, but many are too strained." Bosley Crowther of The New York Times considered Casino Royale had "more of the talent agent than the secret agent". He praised the film's "fast start" and the scenes up to the baccarat game between Bond and Le Chiffre. Afterward, Crowther felt, the script became tiresome, repetitive and filled with clichés due to "wild and haphazard injections of 'in' jokes and outlandish gags", leading to an excessive length that made the film a "reckless, disconnected nonsense that could be telescoped or stopped at any point".

Writing in 1986, Danny Peary noted, "It's hard to believe that in 1967 we actually waited in anticipation for this so-called James Bond spoof. It was a disappointment then; it's a curio today, but just as hard to get through."  Peary described the film as being "disjointed and stylistically erratic" and "a testament to wastefulness in the bigger-is-better cinema," before adding, "It would have been a good idea to cut the picture drastically, perhaps down to the scenes featuring Peter Sellers and Woody Allen. In fact, I recommend you see it on television when it's in a two-hour (including commercials) slot. Then you won't expect it to make any sense."

A few recent reviewers have been more impressed. Andrea LeVasseur, in the AllMovie review, called it "the original ultimate spy spoof", and opined that the "nearly impossible to follow" plot made it "a satire to the highest degree". Further describing it as a "hideous, zany disaster" LeVasseur concluded that it was "a psychedelic, absurd masterpiece". Cinema historian Robert von Dassanowsky has written about the artistic merits of the film and says "like Casablanca, Casino Royale is a film of momentary vision, collaboration, adaption, pastiche, and accident. It is the anti-auteur work of all time, a film shaped by the very zeitgeist it took on." Romano Tozzi complimented the acting and humour, although he also mentioned that the film has several dull stretches. In his review of the film, Leonard Maltin remarked, "Money, money everywhere, but [the] film is terribly uneven – sometimes funny, often not." Simon Winder called Casino Royale "a pitiful spoof", while Robert Druce described it as "an abstraction of real life".

The website's critical consensus states: "A goofy, dated parody of spy movie cliches, Casino Royale squanders its all-star cast on a meandering, mostly laugh-free script."

Accolades

American Film Institute nominated the film in AFI's 100 Years of Film Scores.

Home media and film rights
Columbia Pictures first issued Casino Royale on VHS in 1989, and on Laserdisc in 1994. In 1999, following the Columbia/MGM/Kevin McClory lawsuit on ownership of the Bond film series, the rights were transferred to Metro-Goldwyn-Mayer (whose sister company United Artists co-owns the franchise) as a condition of the settlement. MGM then released the first DVD edition of Casino Royale in 2002, followed by a 40th anniversary special edition in 2007.

Years later, as a result of the Sony/Comcast acquisition of MGM, Columbia would once again become responsible for the co-distribution of this film as well as the entire Eon Bond series, including the 2006 adaptation of Casino Royale. However, MGM Home Entertainment changed its distributor to 20th Century Fox Home Entertainment in May 2006. Fox was responsible for the distribution and debut of the 1967 Casino Royale on Blu-ray in 2011. While the rights today stand with United Artists (under MGM, who currently maintains home entertainment rights), Danjaq LLC, Eon's holding company, is credited as one of its present copyright owners, the other being original production unit Famous Artists Productions.

Alongside six other MGM-owned films, the studio uploaded Casino Royale on YouTube.

See also

 Outline of James Bond

References
Explanatory notes

Citations

Bibliography

External links

 Casino Royale at Metro-Goldwyn-Mayer
Casino Royale at Films de France
 

1967 films
1960s parody films
1960s satirical films
1960s spy comedy films
British parody films
British satirical films
Cold War spy films
Columbia Pictures films
Films based on thriller novels
Films directed by Val Guest
Films directed by Ken Hughes
Films directed by John Huston
Films directed by Robert Parrish
Films scored by Burt Bacharach
Films set in London
Films set in Scotland
Films set in Berlin
Films set in East Germany
Films shot at Pinewood Studios
Films shot in Berkshire
Films shot in County Meath
Films shot in Scotland
Films with live action and animation
Cultural depictions of Mata Hari
Films about gambling
Films about baccarat
James Bond films
Films directed by Joseph McGrath (film director)
Parody films based on James Bond films
Films with screenplays by Wolf Mankowitz
Films with screenplays by John Law (writer)
1967 comedy films
Psychedelic films
British spy comedy films
Films about the Berlin Wall
Films shot at Shepperton Studios
Films shot at Twickenham Film Studios
Films shot in London
1960s English-language films
Casino Royale (novel)